Gerardus Cornelis "Tin" Dekkers (September 18, 1916 – October 8, 2005) was a Dutch boxer who competed in the 1936 Summer Olympics.

He was born in Rotterdam and was the younger brother of Hens Dekkers.

In 1936 he was eliminated in the quarterfinals of the middleweight class after losing his fight to the upcoming bronze medalist Raúl Villarreal. He died in Orp-Jauche, Belgium in 2005.

External links
Tin Dekkers' profile at Sports Reference.com

1916 births
2005 deaths
Middleweight boxers
Olympic boxers of the Netherlands
Boxers at the 1936 Summer Olympics
Boxers from Rotterdam
Dutch male boxers